"She's The Sun" is a song by German band Scooter. It was released in August 2000 as the second and last single from their seventh studio album Sheffield.

Content
The drumloop in "She's The Sun" is sampled from the introduction of Led Zeppelin's version of "When the Levee Breaks", taken from the 1971 album Led Zeppelin IV. "Sunrise (Ratty's Inferno)" was used as the basis for "Sunrise (Here I Am)", the 2001 début single from Scooter's side project Ratty.

Track listing
CD Single
"She's The Sun" [Radio Edit] (3:44)
"She's The Sun" [Extended] (4:52)
"Sunrise (Ratty's Inferno)" (5:39)
"She's The Sun" Video (4:00)

Limited Edition CD Single
"She's The Sun" [Radio Edit] (3:44)
"She's The Sun" [Extended] (4:52)
"Sunrise (Ratty's Inferno)" (5:39)
"H.P. for your Answering Machine Vol. 1" (0:10)
"H.P. for your Answering Machine Vol. 2" (0:06)
"She's The Sun" Video (4:00)

Chart performance

References

Scooter (band) songs
2000 singles
Songs written by H.P. Baxxter
Songs written by Rick J. Jordan
2000 songs
Songs written by Jens Thele